A striptease is a type of erotic dance involving gradual removal of clothing.

Striptease or strip tease may also refer to:

 Strip Tease (Lady Saw album), a 2004 studio album by Lady Saw
 Strip Tease (Acid Drinkers album), a 1992 studio album by Acid Drinkers
 Strip Tease (novel), a 1993 Carl Hiaasen novel
 Striptease (film), a 1996 adaptation of the novel starring Demi Moore
 Striptease (novel), a 1957 novel by Georges Simenon
 "Striptease", a song by Hawksley Workman

Stripper may refer to:
 The Stripper, a 1962 US number-one single

he:סטריפטיז